William Ormston Backhouse (1885 – 1962) was an English agriculturalist and geneticist, and a member of the Backhouse family of County Durham, several generations of which were influential in the development of horticulture.

William Ormston Backhouse worked for a period of fíve years at the Cambridge Plant Breeding Station and the John Innes Institute, but left Britain to become a geneticist for the Argentine Government. He established a number of wheat-breeding stations in Argentina, then moved to Patagonia, where he reared pigs, grew apples and other fruits and started intensive honey production. He returned to England and bred red-trumpet daffodils at Sutton Court.

References

1885 births
1962 deaths
People educated at Bradfield College
People from Darlington
People from County Durham
English agronomists
English geneticists
English botanists